The  is a denomination of Japanese yen. The current design was first minted in silver in 1959 and saw a change of metal in 1967. It is the second-highest denomination coin in Japan after the 500 yen coin. The current 100 yen coin is one of two denominations which depict the emperor's rule date in Arabic numerals rather than Kanji.

History

Silver yen
100 yen coinage was first authorized in 1951 with the specification that the coins be made of a silver alloy. The first coins were minted for circulation in 1957 which featured a phoenix on the reverse. The alloy decided upon consisted of 60% silver, 30% copper, and 10% zinc and came at a time when banknotes of the same denomination were already in circulation. The "100 yen" bill hence became a substitute to the coin as the two were allowed to co-circulate. The design of the coin was changed in 1959 which removed Latin script ("Yen"), and changed the reverse side to show a sheaf of rice. To commemorate the summer 1964 Olympics in Tokyo 16 million ounces of silver was used to strike the 80,000,000 coins produced. None of these coins were recorded as ever going into circulation as they were grabbed and stored away as collectors items. The usage of silver worldwide for coinage was about to take a turn though, as the price of the bullion increased dramatically. The Japanese government had planned on producing 800 million silver coins over a 10 year span, but the amount of silver held was insufficient. Silver was dropped from the coinage in 1967, which led to coin hoarding and silver smuggling outside of the country for melting.

Cupronickel yen
The current design of the 100 yen coin debuted in 1967, and features sakura blossoms and the denomination in Japanese. A new alloy of 75% copper and 25% nickel (cupronickel) was decided upon to replace the former silver alloy. It was reported that by 1969 the monetary value in the old silver coins was $3 (USD) an ounce, prompting a "coin retirement" plan by the government. On August 1, 1974 one hundred yen notes were withdrawn from circulation, but post World War II dated notes were allowed to retain their legal tender status. The amount of coins produced then decreased from the mid to late 1970s as a possible attempt to control economic inflation. The issuance of the new 100 yen coin has also been cited as a factor in the rapid spread of vending machines during this decade. By the late 1970s into the early 1980s a myth was established that tied the amount of coins produced with the growing popularity of the arcade game industry, particularly the 1978 game Space Invaders. While there were reports of Japanese cities briefly running out of 100 yen coins, arcade operators would have emptied out their machines and taken the money back to the bank which kept the coins circulating. 

Production of the 100 yen coin dropped going into the mid 1980s due to various proposed reasoning. Japan at the time had been in economic decline caused in part by trade tensions with other countries that were competing with Japanese exports. The Japanese government was trying to deflate the yen, and achieve more imports and less exports. Another explanation put forward is the introduction of the 500 yen coin in 1982. The Japanese mint at the time stated that a higher value coin was needed for use in vending machines. In any case mintage figures recovered towards the very end of Emperor Shōwa's reign. No coins were minted in 1989 (year 64) as molds needed to make coins for Akihito had already begun. Denominations of 1, 5, 10, and 500 yen were given priority over 50 and 100 yen coins. By the mid 1990s 100-yen shops were expanding into retail chains, these "shops" are akin to American dollar stores. Coin production remained unhindered during the early years of Akihito's reign until the millennium, when 500 yen coins were turned out in record numbers. The offset caused low mintage numbers which included only 8,024,000 pieces struck in 2001, a record low for the series. The '100 yen" coin continues to be produced to the present day as the second-highest denomination of yen coinage.

Composition

Designs

Circulation figures

Shōwa

The following are circulation dates which cover Emperor Hirohito's reign. The dates below correspond with the 32nd to the 64th year (last) of his reign. One hundred yen coins had three main different designs, but there was no overlap in mintage between them. When these coins were first made they used Kanji script to represent the date. The current one-hundred yen coin dates to 1967 (year 42) when Arabic numerals were used to reflect the emperor's year of reign (date). Coins for this period will all begin with the Japanese symbol 昭和 (Shōwa).

Japanese coins are read with a left to right format: 
"Emperors name" → "Number representing year of reign" → "Year" (Ex: 昭和 → 53 → 年).

Heisei
The following are circulation dates during the reign of Emperor Akihito. who was crowned in 1989. The dates below correspond with the 1st to the 31st year (last) of his reign. First year of reign coins are marked with a 元 symbol (first) as a one year type. Coins for this period all use Arabic numerals for a date, and begin with the Japanese symbol 平成 (Heisei).

Japanese coins are read with a left to right format: 
"Emperors name" → "Number representing year of reign" → "Year" (Ex: 平成 → 16 → 年).

Reiwa
The following are circulation dates in the reign of the current Emperor. Naruhito's accession to the Crysanthemum Throne took place on May 1, 2019 and he was formally enthroned on October 22, 2019. Coins for this period all begin with the Japanese symbol 令和 (Reiwa). The inaugural year coin (2019) is marked 元 (first).

Japanese coins are read with a left to right format: 
"Emperors name" → "Number representing year of reign" → "Year" (Ex: 令和 → 3 → 年).

Commemoratives

Notes

References

Japanese yen coins
One-hundred-base-unit coins